Azov Shipyard (SRZ, LLC)  is the largest  ship repair enterprise in the Sea of Azov (Ukraine) specializing in ship repair, shipbuilding, mechanical engineering and cargo transshipment. Azov Shipyard is being managed by Management Company Mariupol Investment Group (MC MIG, LLC).
Dmitriy Lyashov is the General Director of Azov Shipyard. The shipyard was formerly known as Zhdanov Shipyard. The shipyard has since privatized and is known as Azov ship-repair factory enterprise and is subordinate to ''System Capital Management.

The yard is located in Mariupol, Ukraine.

History
The history of Azov Shipyard started in 1886 when the first mechanic workshops were built for Mariupol's port. In 1931 the complex of mechanic workshops were organized in Mariupol Shipyard. In 1989 the shipyard got its modern name – Azov Shipyard. The enterprise has been managed by MC MIG, LLC since 2010.

Ship repair
Azov Shipyard has a floating dock with a lifting capacity of 15 thousand tons. The enterprise is capable of handling vessels with length up to 200 meters and width up to 25 meters with an approach channel allowing to accept vessels with draft of up to 8 meters.
The enterprise performs the repair of sea and river vessels.  The facilities of Azov Shipyard allow repairing of up to 120 vessels annually and perform overhaul and dock repairs.   The yard also manufactures spare parts for all kinds of vessels. 
Besides that Azov Shipyard has its own cleaning station for fuel and cargo tanks.

Transshipment of cargoes
SRZ, LLC provides the transshipment of the oversized and heavy cargos using the developed  infrastructure of rail roads and berth lines, its own diesel shunters, cranes, necessary technological equipment.   The enterprise has 8 berths (1.24 kilometers of total length) equipped with gantry cranes with a capacity from 5 to 40 tons. Total area for cargos accumulation is more than 21 thousand square meters. The depth of the water near the berths is 8 meters.

Shipbuilding
SRZ, LLC is the only Ukrainian enterprise capable to perform shipbuilding. The enterprise builds different types of self-propelled and non-self-propelled ships, sea port-roads oil-skimming ships, floating docks, berths, pontoons and other elements of hull shipbuilding. More than 200 ships have been built by the enterprise since it started operating.

All the ports of the former USSR were equipped with oil-skimming ships by Azov Shipyard. Azov Shipyard provided the ports of India, Cuba, Germany, Romania, Montenegro, Poland, Bulgaria, Greece, UAE with its port-roads oil-skimming ships.

Notable vessels
The shipyard built most landing crafts of the Ondatra-class landing craft.

Engineering
The enterprise provides mechanical processing of the details for the fleet and fleet-related industries. It provides work on universal lathe, milling, vertical-turning lathe, boring, and gear cutting machines. Casting and forging production at the yard allows producing details from cast iron and non-ferrous metals for vessels and equipment.
Azov Shipyard produces the hoisting and handling equipment and metal structures. Nowadays the enterprise has gained experience in production and can supply over 120 different models of rope grabs (with a capacity of 2.5 to 35 tons) that can be used by metallurgical plants, sea and river ports to transship bulk cargos and scrap metal.

References

1886 establishments in Ukraine
Companies established in 1886
Economy of Mariupol
Buildings and structures in Mariupol
Companies based in Mariupol
Shipyards of Ukraine
Shipbuilding companies of Ukraine
Shipbuilding companies of the Soviet Union
Sea of Azov